Philip Lester Bartlett II (born September 24, 1976) is an American lawyer and politician from Maine. A Democrat, he served in the Maine Senate from 2004 to 2012, representing the 6th district (Scarborough, Westbrook and his hometown of Gorham). In November 2014, Bartlett was elected Chairman of the Maine Democratic Party.

Early life and career
Raised in Gorham, Bartlett attended Gorham public schools, graduating from Gorham High School in 1994. He was an active boy scout throughout his youth, attaining the rank of Eagle Scout. On leaving high school, he went to Tufts University, majoring in economics and political science. Following Tufts, he attended Harvard Law School, where he earned a J.D. and served as president of the Harvard Journal on Legislation.

Admitted to practice law in Maine and Massachusetts, he spent the year following his law school graduation clerking for Leigh Saufley, chief justice of the Maine Supreme Judicial Court. He is today a lawyer specializing in workers' compensation with the firm of Scaccia, Lenkowski, Aranson & Bartlett in Sanford, Maine.

In politics
In 2004, at the age of 28, Bartlett ran for the Maine Senate in the 6th district. He won the Democratic primary election held on June 8, 2004, taking 59% of the vote against Gorham resident Edward Needham. In the general election held on November 2, he faced incumbent Sen. Carolyn Gilman, a Republican from Westbrook, defeating her by 53% to 47% – a margin of 1,168 votes. He won re-election in 2006, 2008 and 2010.

Bartlett served as senate majority leader in the 124th Legislature (2009–10), losing the position following the 2010 election that saw Republicans take back the senate majority. Term limits prevented him from seeking a fifth term in 2012.

Bartlett was elected to a four-year term on the Democratic National Committee at the Maine Democratic Party Convention on June 2, 2012.

Personal
Bartlett has been involved in numerous civic associations, serving as president of the Gorham Historical Society and the Baxter Memorial Library Association. He has also served on the boards of the Presumpscot Regional Land Trust, the Gorham Economic Development Corporation, the Gorham Recreation Advisory Board and the Cumberland County Human Services Advisory Committee. He attends the First Parish Congregational Church in Gorham.

Bartlett is openly gay. He has one daughter.

References

External links 
 Campaign website

1976 births
21st-century American politicians
Gay politicians
Harvard Law School alumni
LGBT state legislators in Maine
Living people
Maine Democratic Party chairs
Maine lawyers
Maine state senators
Politicians from Gorham, Maine
Tufts University School of Arts and Sciences alumni
Gorham High School (Maine) alumni